Weledeh Catholic School is an elementary/middle school in Yellowknife, Northwest Territories, Canada, operated by the Yellowknife Catholic School Board. The first Catholic School was opened in Yellowknife in 1953 and has since expanded into more modern buildings, with Weledeh School completed in 2001 as an addition to St. Patrick High School.

In addition to English, Weledeh offers a class in traditional Dene culture, including the Dogrib language. They also have a late entry French immersion program beginning in Grade 6.

See also
 List of schools in the Northwest Territories

External links
(Weledeh Catholic School
Yellowknife Catholic Schools

Education in Yellowknife
Middle schools in the Northwest Territories
Elementary schools in the Northwest Territories
Roman Catholic schools in the Northwest Territories
Educational institutions established in 1953
1953 establishments in the Northwest Territories